William Lister (c. 1882 – July 1900) was a British water polo player who is credited with a gold medal in the 1900 Summer Olympics. Lister was a member of the Osborne Swimming Club of Manchester, which fielded the winning team. The International Olympic Committee lists Lister as a gold medalist in the event, but this is incorrect, as he died two weeks before the Games.

References

DatabaseOlympics
IOC database

1880s births
1900 deaths
British male water polo players
Year of birth uncertain